Antonina Jadwiga Siemaszko (born July 14, 1970) is an American actress. Best known for her film roles in Little Noises (1992), The Saint of Fort Washington (1993), and for her role as Eleanor Bartlet in The West Wing (2001–2006).

Biography
Siemaszko was born in Chicago. Her father, Konstanty, was a Polish-born Roman Catholic, and a survivor of Polish Underground and Sachsenhausen concentration camp. Her mother, Collette McAllister, was English. One of her brothers is actor Casey Siemaszko. Her other brother, Corky, is a writer for Daily News and a reporter at NBC News. She attended The Theatre School at DePaul University. She played an undercover cop in Reservoir Dogs featured in a scene that wound up on the cutting room floor. It was released on DVD. She played Mia Farrow in the CBS miniseries Sinatra. She played the leading role in Wild Orchid II: Two Shades of Blue.

Filmography

Film

Television

Video games

References

External links
 

1970 births
Actresses from Chicago
American film actresses
Polish-American culture in Chicago
DePaul University alumni
American television actresses
American people of English descent
American people of Polish descent
Living people
St. Ignatius College Prep alumni
21st-century American women